Under Your Skin (Finnish: Käpy selän alla) is a 1966 Finnish film  directed by Mikko Niskanen and written by Marja-Leena Mikkola. It stars Kirsti Wallasvaara, Eero Melasniemi, Kristiina Halkola and Pekka Autiovuori as four young adults who are camping in the woods. The film depicts the sexual revolution of the 1960s.

Under Your Skin was the highest-grossing film in Finland since The Unknown Soldier. In addition, it won six Jussi Awards.

References 

Finnish black-and-white films
1966 films